The Kott (Kot) language is an extinct Yeniseian language that was formerly spoken in central Siberia by the banks of Mana River, a tributary of the Yenisei river.  It became extinct in the 1850s. Kott was closely related to Ket, still spoken farther north along the Yenisei river. Assan, a close relative, is sometimes considered a dialect of Kott. 

In 1858, Matthias Castrén published the grammar and dictionary (Versuch einer jenissei-ostjakischen und kottischen Sprachlehre), which included material on the Kott and Ket (Yenisei-Ostyak) languages. There also exists a book made by G.K.Verner "kottskij jazyk" about the Kott language. 

Kott had been influenced by Turkic languages, and had borrowed some words from Turkic languages. For example Kott baktîr- ‘to praise’ comes from Proto-Turkic *paktïr or Kott kolá ‘copper, brass’ comes from Proto-Turkic *kola.

References

External links
 Kott basic lexicon at the Global Lexicostatistical Database

Extinct languages of Asia
Yeniseian languages
Languages extinct in the 19th century